Ramsgate is a suburb in southern Sydney, in the state of New South Wales, Australia 16 km south of the Sydney central business district. It is part of the St George area. Divided by Rocky Point Road, part of Ramsgate to the east of Rocky Point Road is in the local government area of the Bayside Council, whilst properties to the west of Rocky Point Road are in the Georges River Council. Ramsgate Beach is a separate suburb, to the east.

Ramsgate is surrounded by the suburbs of Ramsgate Beach, Monterey, Kogarah, Beverley Park and Sans Souci.

History
The area between Cooks River and Georges River was originally known as Seven Mile Beach. It was changed to Lady Robinson's Beach in 1874 to honour the wife of Governor Sir Hercules Robinson. Cook Park is named after Samuel Cook who advocated it as a public pleasure area. Ramsgate was named after the seaside resort in England. A model village was originally planned for the suburb but later abandoned.

Scarborough Park was created in the 1830s from part of Pat Moore's Swamp or Patmore Swamp. Patrick Moore was granted  of land in 1812. It was named by the Hon. Thomas Holt after the English coastal town of Scarborough, Yorkshire and the First Fleet convict ship which was briefly anchored in Botany Bay in 1788.

Commercial area
The suburb is mostly residential with a shopping strip on Rocky Point Road, near the intersection with Ramsgate Road. The strip includes the post office and a pub called The Intersection. Another shopping strip including a supermarket is located just over the border at Ramsgate Beach, on Ramsgate Road, near The Grand Parade. Ramsgate RSL Club is located on the border, near this shopping strip.

Parks
 Scarborough Park, Leo Smith Reserve, Tonbridge St Reserve, Rotary Park.

Landmarks
 Syd Frost Memorial Hall
 Ramsgate Primary School
 Ramsgate RSL

Population
According to the 2016 Australian Bureau of Statistics Census of Population, there were 1,114 people usually resident in Ramsgate. 36.4% stated they were born overseas with the top countries of birth being Greece 3.3%, Egypt 3.3%, and England 3.2%. English was stated as the only language spoken at home by 59.6% of residents and the most common other languages spoken were Greek 11.4%, Arabic 5.4%, and Mandarin 3.1%. The most common responses for religious affiliation were Catholic 24.1%, No Religion, so described 18.5%, Orthodox 17.5% and Anglican 12.5%.

References

Suburbs of Sydney
Botany Bay
Georges River Council
Bayside Council